Steve Allee (born September 14, 1950) is an American jazz musician and composer.

Career
Allee attended Ben Davis High School in Indianapolis, Indiana. He was in a band during the early 1970s called the Baron Von Ohlen Quartet which released an album of the same name. By age 19, Allee was touring with the Buddy Rich Orchestra.

Allee's big band album, Downtown Blues, was nominated for a Grammy Award and featured bassist John Clayton and drummer John Von Ohlen. Allee's first national solo record achieved a position of 14 on the Gavin national radio poll.

Allee has worked with Slide Hampton, James Moody, Rufus Reid, Bob Mintzer, Randy Brecker, Phil Woods, Curtis Fuller, Jeff Hamilton, Tim Hagans, John Riley, Ira Sullivan, Ed Thigpen, Eddie Vinson, Milt Hinton, and Bobby Shew.

He received a commission to write a four-movement work for the Indianapolis Symphony Orchestra for the 100th anniversary of the Indianapolis Museum of Art, and composing the score for the film New York in the Fifties, based on a book of the same name by Dan Wakefield. The score was performed live at the Montreux Jazz Festival in Switzerland. Allee  composed the soundtrack for Something to Cheer About, the film of the 1954–55 Crispus Attucks basketball team, starring Oscar Robertson. Allee has written music for television shows, including Chicago Hope, Friends, NYPD Blue, Mad About You, Martha Stewart Show, Nash Bridges, Touched by an Angel, and Dharma and Greg. He is the music director for the nationally syndicated radio show The Bob and Tom Show.

Allee signed with Indianapolis jazz label Owl Studios in 2006 and released two albums: Colors in 2007 and Dragonfly in 2008.

Discography
 Steve Allee (Green Tree, 1979)
 Mirage  (1997)
 Colors (Owl, 2007) 
 Dragonfly (Owl, 2008)

References

1950 births
Living people
Musicians from Indianapolis
20th-century American male musicians
20th-century American pianists
21st-century American male musicians
21st-century American pianists
American jazz bandleaders
American jazz composers
American jazz pianists
American male pianists
American male jazz composers
Owl Studios artists
Summit Records artists